Kjell Carlström (born 18 October 1976) is a Finnish former professional road racing cyclist, who competed as a professional between 2002 and 2011. He won the Finnish national road race title in 2000, 2004 and 2011.

He raced in the Tour de France in 2005, 2006 and 2007. His best performance in the Tour de France was a second place stage finish on stage 8 in the 2006 race. In December 2011 he announced his retirement after his contract with Team Sky was not renewed and he was unable to find a new team.

Major results

2003
 1st Stage 7 Tour of Queensland
2004
 1st  Road race, National Road Championships
 1st Overall UNIQA Classic
1st Stage 2
2005
 1st Stage 3 UNIQA Classic
2007
 2nd Road race, National Road Championships
2008
 1st Stage 3 Paris–Nice
 2nd Road race, National Road Championships
 3rd Klasika Primavera
2009
 1st  Road race, National Road Championships
2010
 2nd Road race, National Road Championships
2011
 1st  Road race, National Road Championships

References

External links
 Profile at Team Sky official website
 Profile at Liquigas official website
 
 

1976 births
Living people
Finnish male cyclists
Swedish-speaking Finns
People from Porvoo
Sportspeople from Uusimaa
Directeur sportifs